Little Window is the debut album of American singer-songwriter Baby Dee. The album was released in 2002 on the Durtro label. It was produced, composed, and performed entirely by Dee.

Little Window is currently out of print as a lone album. It has been compiled in its entirety with Love's Small Song and Made for Love as the 2-CD set The Robin's Tiny Throat, released by Durtro Jnana in 2007.

Track listing

All songs composed by Baby Dee.

"Hymn to Anne" – 4:21
"Little Window" – 5:18
"The Robin's Tiny Throat" – 5:19
"Calvary" – 4:33
"A Weakness for Roses" – 8:40
"The Price of a Sparrow" – 2:38
"What About My Father" – 8:02
"Waiting" – 9:54

Personnel
Baby Dee – vocals, piano, accordion, bird calls

References

2001 debut albums
Baby Dee albums
Durtro albums